Rodrigo Filipe dos Santos Ferreira (born 4 November 2001) is a Portuguese footballer who plays for Montalegre on loan from Leixões as a midfielder.

Football career
He made his professional debut for Leixões on 30 December 2020 in the Liga Portugal 2.

References

External links

2000 births
People from Vinhais
Sportspeople from Bragança District
Living people
Portuguese footballers
Association football midfielders
GD Bragança players
Leixões S.C. players
C.D. Trofense players
C.D.C. Montalegre players
Campeonato de Portugal (league) players
Liga Portugal 2 players